Bacotoma abjungalis is a moth in the family Crambidae. It was described by Francis Walker in 1859. It is found in Sri Lanka.

References 

Moths described in 1859
Spilomelinae